IT general controls (ITGC) are controls that apply to all systems, components, processes, and data for a given organization or information technology (IT) environment. The objectives of ITGCs are to ensure the proper development and implementation of applications, as well as the integrity of programs, data files, and computer operations.

The most common ITGCs:
 Logical access controls over infrastructure, applications, and data.
 System development life cycle controls.
 Program change management controls.
 Data center physical security controls.
 System and data backup and recovery controls.
 Computer operation controls.

General Computer Controls 
ITGCs may also be referred to as General Computer Controls (GCC) which are defined as:
Controls, other than application controls, which relate to the environment within which computer-based application systems are developed, maintained and operated, and which are therefore applicable to all applications. The objectives of general controls are to ensure the proper development and implementation of applications, the integrity of program and data files and of computer operations. Like application controls, general controls may be either manual or programmed. Examples of general controls include the development and implementation of an IS strategy and an IS security policy, the organization of IS staff to separate conflicting duties and planning for disaster prevention and recovery.

Global Technology Audit Guide (GTAG)
GTAGs are written in straightforward business language to address a timely issue related to information technology (IT) management, control, and security. To date, the Institute of Internal Auditors (IIA) has released GTAGs on the following topics:
 GTAG 1: Information Technology Controls
 GTAG 2: Change and Patch Management Controls: Critical for Organizational Success
 GTAG 3: Continuous Auditing: Implications for Assurance, Monitoring, and Risk Assessment
 GTAG 4: Management of IT Auditing
 GTAG 5: Managing and Auditing Privacy Risks
 GTAG 6: Managing and Auditing IT Vulnerabilities
 GTAG 7: Information Technology Outsourcing
 GTAG 8: Auditing Application Controls
 GTAG 9: Identity and Access Management
 GTAG 10: Business Continuity Management
 GTAG 11: Developing the IT Audit Plan
 GTAG 12: Auditing IT Projects
 GTAG 13: Fraud Prevention and Detection in the Automated World
 GTAG 14: Auditing User-developed Applications
 GTAG 15: Formerly Information Security Governance--Removed and combined with GTAG 17
 GTAG 16: Data Analysis Technologies
 GTAG 17: Auditing IT Governance

See also
Information technology controls
Internal Audit
 Internal Control
SOX 404 top–down risk assessment

References
 GTAG 8: Christine Bellino, Jefferson Wells, July 2007
 GTAG 8: Steve Hunt, Enterprise Controls Consulting LP, Enterprise Controls Consulting LP, July 2007
 ISACA Glossary of terms

External links
 The Institute of Internal Auditors
 Information Systems Audit and Control Association

Auditing
Information technology audit